Žirovski Vrh is a dispersed settlement in the hills east of Žiri in the Upper Carniola region of Slovenia. It is made up of isolated farmsteads and small hamlets on the southeastern slopes of a range called Žiri Peak. The dispersed nature of the settlement on the hill continues into the neighbouring Municipality of Gorenja Vas–Poljane with the settlements of Žirovski Vrh Svetega Antona and Žirovski Vrh Svetega Urbana on its northern slopes.

References

External links

Žirovski Vrh on Geopedia

Populated places in the Municipality of Žiri